Copatana River is a river of Amazonas state in north-western Brazil. It is a tributary of the Jutaí River, and flows into this river about  before the Jutai merges into the Amazon River.

See also
List of rivers of Amazonas

References
Brazilian Ministry of Transport

Rivers of Amazonas (Brazilian state)